Jūshirō, Jushiro or Juushirou (written: 十四郎 or 重四郎) is a masculine Japanese given name. Notable people with the name include:

 (1866–1925), Japanese politician
 (1914–1977), Japanese actor

Fictional characters 
Jūshirō Ukitake, a character in the manga series Bleach

Japanese masculine given names